The  is an unusual "T"-shaped three-way bridge in Hiroshima, Japan. The original bridge, constructed in 1932, was the aiming point for the 1945 Hiroshima atom bomb because its shape was easily recognized from the air and also because the bridge was close to the center of the city. Although the bridge was not destroyed by the atomic blast, it did sustain heavy damage. After the war, the bridge was repaired and remained in service for nearly four decades, before it was replaced by a new bridge (built as a replica) in 1983. A surviving portion of a floor girder from the original bridge was subsequently donated to the Hiroshima Peace Memorial Museum.

The downstroke of the "T" links the main bridge to the island, and is also the north entrance to the Hiroshima Peace Memorial Park.

References

External links 

 Virtual tour of the Hiroshima Peace Memorial Museum: Aioi Bridge 
 Hiroshima & Nagasaki Remembered: Aioi Bridge

Bridges in Japan
Atomic bombings of Hiroshima and Nagasaki
Three-way bridges
Ōta River